Erubiel Durazo Cárdenas (born January 23, 1975) is a Mexican former professional baseball player. Durazo played for the Arizona Diamondbacks (–) and the Oakland Athletics (–) in Major League Baseball.

Major league career
He helped the Diamondbacks by hitting a 2-out, 2-run home run off Tom Glavine in Game 5 of the 2001 National League Championship Series against the Atlanta Braves, which proved to be the series-winner, and the Diamondbacks went on to win the 2001 World Series.

Durazo enjoyed his best season in  when he hit .321 with 22 home runs and 88 RBI with Oakland. However, his career was derailed by injuries. In , the Texas Rangers invited him to spring training, but he did not make the major league club. He split the 2006 season between the Triple A Oklahoma Redhawks of the Rangers organization, the Triple A Columbus Clippers of the New York Yankees organization, and the Triple A Rochester Red Wings of the Minnesota Twins organization.

Durazo was invited to 2007 spring training by the Oakland Athletics, where he played well, but was released before the start of the season. He joined Sultanes de Monterrey of the Mexican League. On July 17, 2007, Durazo signed a minor league contract with the Yankees, playing in 29 games for their Triple-A team. Durazo became a free agent at the end of the season. He currently resides in Chandler, Arizona with his wife Martha and their daughter Mariana Durazo.

In 624 games over seven seasons, Durazo posted a .281 batting average (547-for-1948) with 333 runs, 108 doubles, 6 triples, 94 home runs, 330 RBI, 307 bases on balls, .381 on-base percentage and .487 slugging percentage. He finished his career with a .988 fielding percentage playing at first base and several games at right field. In 16 postseason games, he hit .234 (11-for-47) with 5 runs, 3 doubles, 2 home runs, 7 RBI and 8 walks.

Career in Mexican Pacific League
Durazo has been playing in Mexico for the Naranjeros de Hermosillo since the – season in which he was the rookie of the year. For the 2009–2010 Mexican Pacific League season he was sent to Águilas de Mexicali, but later that same season he was sent on loan to Yaquis de Obregón.

External links

MLB Statistics, Bio and Photos

1974 births
2006 World Baseball Classic players
2009 World Baseball Classic players
Arizona Diamondbacks players
Baseball players from Sonora
Columbus Clippers players
Living people
Major League Baseball first basemen
Major League Baseball players from Mexico
Mexican expatriate baseball players in the United States
Oakland Athletics players
Oklahoma RedHawks players
Sportspeople from Hermosillo
Rochester Red Wings players
Scranton/Wilkes-Barre Yankees players
Sportspeople from Chandler, Arizona
Tucson Sidewinders players